Helga Gnauer (9 October 1929 – 24 January 1990) was an Austrian fencer. She competed in the women's individual and team foil events at the 1960 Summer Olympics and the 1957 World Championship.

References

External links
 

1929 births
1990 deaths
Austrian female foil fencers
Olympic fencers of Austria
Fencers at the 1960 Summer Olympics
Fencers from Vienna